East Rain is the second solo album by London-based drum and bass artist Shri, released in 2005 by Drum the Bass.

Track listing
 "Appa2"
 "Heavy World"
 "East Rain"
 "Lifecycle"
 "Tarana"
 "Di Floris"
 "Watching"
 "Mela"
 "Ethni-City"
 "Strange"
 "A Piece of Peace"

References

2005 albums
Shri (musician) albums